Uebelmannia buiningii is a species of plant in the family Cactaceae. It is endemic to Brazil.  Its natural habitat is dry savanna. It is threatened by habitat loss.

Description
Uebelmannia buiningii grows with greenish to reddish brown, spherical to short cylindrical bodies that reach diameters of up to 8 centimeters. The epidermis is rough due to wax deposits. The 18 straight ribs are spaced 15 millimeters apart. They are divided into about 5 millimeters distant downward cusps. The areoles are covered with a little wool. The 4 middle spines are crossed. The 2 to 4 straight edge spines are up to 5 mm long and shorter than the middle spines.

The yellow flowers are up to 2.7 inches long and reach a diameter of 2 centimeters. The egg-shaped fruits are yellow and have diameters of up to 4 millimeters.

References

External links
 
 

Flora of Brazil
Uebelmannia
Critically endangered plants
Taxonomy articles created by Polbot